Ulrich Moissl (born 2 January 1974) is a German field hockey player. He competed in the men's tournament at the 2000 Summer Olympics.

References

External links
 

1974 births
Living people
German male field hockey players
Olympic field hockey players of Germany
Field hockey players at the 2000 Summer Olympics
Field hockey players from Vienna